Linderpur is a village that is governed by Panchayat law in the Bijnor district of the Indian state of Uttar Pradesh. The historical local name of the village was Nanderpur.Shobhit Kumar Chauhan is current Pradhan and Sarpanch of this village. It is located on State Highway 77.

Geography 
It belongs to the Moradabad division and is situated on both sides of Uttar Pradesh State Highway (U.P.S.H.)No:77. It is a central hub For nearly villages which are connected through Linderpur - Dharupur Link Road. Most travel to surrounding villages passes through it. It is 43 km south of the district headquarters in Bijnor, 11 km from tehsil headquarter Chandpur, 5 km from neighbouring block town Noorpur, 417 km from the state capital Lucknow and 138 km from the national capital New Delhi. The elevation of this area is approximately 869 feet above sea level

Economy 
The main activities of this village include cane plants, cane crushers, brickworks, wood-razing and bakeries. One recent development is a central market which extends from the primary school to Harcharan Singh Market on Main Amroha road.

Education 
It has a government-run primary and junior school. It has also one private educational institution, Manbhavan Sarvjanik Children Academy which is up to class X.

References

Villages in Bijnor district